As used by ordnance departments and armories, an Eprouvette is a one piece, fixed elevation mortar used to test the strength of gunpowder.  It went out of general use by the middle of the 19th century.  In use, a carefully weighed quantity of powder (charge) was placed inside, followed by a standard weight shot.  The charge was fired and the distance the shot flew was measured and compared to the expected standard distance.  It was first introduced in the middle of the 1600s.

Eprouvettes were also used to test the strength of small-arms powder, starting in the second half of the 1500s. These evolved into pistol-size devices which were used until the end of the black powder era, at the close of the 1800s.

References

External links
 Eprouvette Mortar

Mortars
Trial and research firearms